Luc Julian Matthys (3 May 1935 – 26 January 2021) was a Belgian-born Australian Roman Catholic bishop.

Matthys was born in Drongen, Ghent, Belgium and was ordained to the priesthood in 1961 for the Roman Catholic Archdiocese of Johannesburg, South Africa. Matthys was incardinated as a priest for the Roman Catholic Archdiocese of Melbourne, Australia, in 1976.  He served as bishop of the Roman Catholic Diocese of Armidale, Australia from 1999 to 2011.

Notes

1935 births
2021 deaths
Clergy from Ghent
Belgian emigrants to Australia
21st-century Roman Catholic bishops in Australia
20th-century Belgian Roman Catholic priests
Roman Catholic bishops of Armidale